WOW Gospel Christmas includes thirty songs on a double CD album.  In 2007 it reached #78 on the Billboard 200 chart, took first place on the Top Gospel Albums chart, and 20th spot on the Top R&B/Hip-Hop Albums chart.  In 2008 it reached 24th spot on the Top R&B/Hip-Hop Albums chart.

Track listing

Disc 1 

Do You Hear What I Hear - Cece Winans - 5:15
O Holy Night - Smokie Norful - 5:19
His Name Is Jesus - Fred Hammond - 4:29
Go Tell It On The Mountain - Lashun Pace - 4:23
Little Drummer Boy - Darwin Hobbs - 5:01
O What A Night - Richard Smallwood/Vision - 5:39
God Speaking - Mandisa - 4:54
Agnus Dei - Donnie McClurkin - 3:44
In The Presence Of A King - The Tri-City Singers - 4:52
Mary Did You Know - Vanessa Bell Armstrong - 3:52
Joy To The World - Beverly Crawford - 3:45
It's Christmas Time - Juanita Bynum & Myron Williams - 5:01
O Little Town Of Bethlehem - Yolanda Adams - 4:08
Hallelujah Chorus - The McClurkin Project - 4:42
Holy, Holy, Holy - Kurt Carr & The Kurt Carr Singers - 6:25

Disc 2 

O Come - Israel & New Breed - 5:09
This Christmas - Kierra "KiKi" Sheard & Marcus Cole - 3:31
Away In A Manger - Angie Winans, T.D. Jakes - 5:40
Glory To The Lamb - Marvin Sapp - 5:44
Now Behold The Lamb - Kirk Franklin & The Family - 6:58
Lamb - Donald Lawrence - 5:39
The First Noel - Aaron Neville - 4:22
Lamb Of God - Nicole C. Mullen - 4:18
Give Love On Christmas - Myron Butler & Levi - 4:29
How Great Is Our God - Dijon - 3:45
Sweet Little Jesus Boy - Take 6 - 3:27
For Unto Us A Child Is Born - Bebe Winans & Cece Winans - 4:29
What Child Is This - Shirley Caesar - 4:01
No Christmas Without You - John P. Kee and New Life - 4:02
Born To Die - Hezekiah Walker & LFC - 5:32

References 

2007 Christmas albums
Christmas compilation albums
2007 compilation albums
WOW series albums
Gospel compilation albums
Gospel Christmas albums